Jana Čepelová was the defending champion but chose not to participate.

Magdalena Fręch won the title, defeating Tereza Smitková in the final, 6–2, 6–1.

Seeds

Draw

Finals

Top half

Bottom half

References

Main Draw

Kuchyně Gorenje Prague Open - Singles